Sadio Doumbia and Calvin Hemery were the defending champions but chose not to defend their title.

Andre Begemann and Jonathan Eysseric won the title after defeating Romain Arneodo and Hugo Nys 6–3, 5–7, [10–4] in the final.

Seeds

Draw

References
 Main Draw

Amex-Istanbul Challenger - Doubles
2017 Doubles